Fiji is an island nation in the Pacific Ocean.

Fiji may also refer to:

 Crown Colony-class cruiser, Royal Navy class of light cruiser, the first eight vessels are known as Fiji class
 HMS Fiji (58), vessel of the above class
 Fiji Airways, the flag carrier airline of Fiji
 Fiji Water, a bottled water company
 Fiji, Saudi Arabia, a village
 Phi Gamma Delta, North-American college fraternity also known as FIJI
 Fiji (software), image processing software
 Fiji, codename for some models of the AMD Radeon Rx 300 series of graphics processor by AMD
 Little Fiji, a female professional wrestler from the Gorgeous Ladies of Wrestling
 Mountain Fiji, a female professional wrestler from the Gorgeous Ladies of Wrestling

See also
 Fidji, perfume of Guy Laroche created by Joséphine Catapano in 1966 and launched in 1973
 Fuji (disambiguation)